Robert W. Tessier (June 2, 1934 – October 11, 1990) was an American actor and stuntman who was best known for playing heavy, menacing characters in films and on television.

Early life
Born in Lowell, Massachusetts, of Abenaki and French descent, Tessier served as a paratrooper in the Korean War earning both a Silver Star and Purple Heart.

Performing career
Tessier was an accomplished motorcycle rider doing stunts in the circus. These skills helped him secure his first film role in The Born Losers directed by Tom Laughlin.

With his shaven head, size and threatening appearance, Tessier went on to play a series of villainous roles on both TV and in film. 

Tessier starred as the menacing convict "Connie Shokner" in the 1974 comedy-drama The Longest Yard with Burt Reynolds (whom he counted as one of his friends) and as Kevin in The Deep. He also played alongside Charles Bronson, as a bare knuckle fighter in the film Hard Times and as a main villain in Breakheart Pass.

In his spare time, Tessier was an accomplished cabinet maker often making pieces for his co-stars.

Death
Tessier died of cancer October 11, 1990, aged 56.  He was survived by his six children, mother and two sisters.

Filmography

 The Born Losers (1967) – Cueball (as Robert W. Tessier)
 The Glory Stompers (1967) – Magoo
 The Sidehackers (1968) – Jake (as Bob Tessier)
 Run, Angel, Run! (1969) – Gang Leader (uncredited)
 Five the Hard Way (1969) – Jake (as Bob Tessier)
 The Babysitter (1969) – Laurence Mackey
 Cry Blood, Apache (1970) – Two Card Charlie
 The Hard Ride (1971)
 The Jesus Trip (1971) – Duncan
 Private Duty Nurses (1971) – Super bouncer
 Outlaw Riders (1971) – Beans (as Bob Tessier)
 The Velvet Vampire (1971) – Biker (as Bob Tessier)
 Gentle Savage (1973) – Greywolf
 The Longest Yard (1974) – Connie Shokner
 How Come Nobody's on Our Side? (1975) – Bike Rider (as Bob Tessier)
 Doc Savage: The Man of Bronze (1975) – Dutchman
 Hard Times (1975) – Jim Henry
 Breakheart Pass (1975) – Levi Calhoun
 The Deep (1977) – Kevin
 Another Man, Another Chance (1977) – Blacksmith
 Hooper (1978) – Amtrac
 Starcrash (1979) – Chief Thor
 The Villain (1979) – Mashing Finger
 Steel (1979) – Cherokee
 The Cannonball Run (1981) – Biker (as Bob Tessier)
 The Sword and the Sorcerer (1982) – Verdugo
 Double Exposure (1982) – Bartender
 The Lost Empire (1985) – Koro
 Avenging Angel (1985) – Tattoo Artist
 The Fix (1985) – Spook
 No Safe Haven (1987) – Randy
 One Man Force (1989) – Wilson
 Beverly Hills Brats (1989) – Slick
 Future Force (1989) – Becker
 Nightwish (1989) – Stanley
 Fertilize the Blaspheming Bombshell (1990) – Devil-master
 Fists of Steel (1991) – Saylor (final film role)

Television 
 Kung Fu (1974) – Aztec Warrior
 Little House on the Prairie (Survival, 1975) – Chief Jack Lame Horse (as Jack Lame Horse)
 The Last of the Mohicans (1977) – Magua
 Centennial (1978–1979) – Rude Water
 Desperate Women (1978) – Outlaw (uncredited)
 Hart to Hart (1979) "Max in love" episode – Mover #1 
 Starsky & Hutch (2-part episode in 1979) – Soldier
 The Billion Dollar Threat (1979) – Benjamin
 Buck Rogers in the 25th Century (2 episodes both in 1979) – Marcos
 The Dukes of Hazzard (1980) – Mitch Henderson
 The Incredible Hulk (1980) – Johnny
 Vega$ (1980) – Sawyer
 Fantasy Island (1981) – Flynt
 The Fall Guy (1981–1986) – Thug / Harvey / Garvey / Prisoner
 CHiPs (1982) – Zorn
 The A-Team (1983–1985) – Mute / Scully
 Manimal (1983) – Sailor Poker Player (as Robert W. Tessier)
 The Rousters (1983) – Bender
 Magnum, P.I. (1984) – Murderer
 Spenser: For Hire (1985) – Conan
 Amazing Stories (1986) – Woodsman
 Sledge Hammer! (1987) – Stoolie
 B.L. Stryker (1989)

References

External links
 
 
 
 First of a series of commercials Tessier did for Midas Muffler in the 1980s

1934 births
1990 deaths
20th-century American male actors
Actors from Lowell, Massachusetts
American male film actors
American people who self-identify as being of Native American descent
American stunt performers
Deaths from cancer in Massachusetts
Military personnel from Massachusetts
Recipients of the Silver Star
United States Army personnel of the Korean War
United States Army soldiers
Abenaki people